The following is a list of the compositions of Niels Gade (1817–1890).

A numbered, thematic catalogue of Gade's works was published online by The Royal Danish Library in 2019.

References

Bibliography 
Catalogues

  Also online: .

Lists of compositions by composer